Nangxian is a village in the Tibet Autonomous Region of China, Tibet is in the south west of china, and the region borders Nepal and India and Butan. It is most well known for its excellent pink mangos.

See also
List of towns and villages in Tibet

Populated places in Tibet